The 1981 World Table Tennis Championships women's singles was the 36th edition of the women's singles championship.
Tong Ling defeated Cao Yanhua in the final by three sets to two, to win the title.

Results

See also
 List of World Table Tennis Championships medalists

References

-
1981 in women's table tennis